is a Japanese actress and gravure idol who is affiliated with ABC Project. She graduated from Sunrise Women Gakuen High School.

Filmography

TV series

References

External links
 Oricon Style profile 

Japanese actresses
Japanese gravure idols
Japanese television personalities
1980 births
Living people
People from Nagano Prefecture